From List of National Natural Landmarks, these are the National Natural Landmarks in the U.S. state of Oregon.

References 

Oregon
National Natural Landmarks